The Fairy Lochs is a recent English name for Na Lochan Sgeireach and are a small group of freshwater lochans approximately  south-east of the village of Badachro, near Gairloch in Wester Ross, Scottish Highlands. The lochans have become known as the 'Fairy Lochs' due to their proximity to 'Sìthean Mòr' which translates as 'Big Fairy Hill'.

The lochans are close to Loch Bràigh Horrisdale, which flows into the Badachro River. There are several large waterfalls in the area, and Sìthean Mor overlooks the Lochan Sgeireach and the bay of Loch Gairloch.

The lochs are remote and are accessed over farmland and along paths through marshy ground.

USAAF Liberator crash memorial 

Although small and remote, the Fairy Lochs are notable as the crash site of an American World War II bomber. On 13 June 1945, a USAAF B-24 Liberator bomber (serial 42-95095, based at the Warton Aerodrome) was returning to the US from Prestwick Airfield at the end of World War II.

On board were a crew of nine from the 66th Bomber Squadron and six passengers from the Air Transport Command.

The aircraft's planned route to Keflavík (Meeks Field) in Iceland should have taken it over Stornoway in the Outer Hebrides, however, for reasons unknown, the aircraft flew instead over the Scottish mainland. Over Wester Ross the aircraft began to lose height and struck the summit of Slioch, losing parts of its bomb bay doors, before flying on towards Gairloch. An attempted crash-landing resulted in the aircraft colliding with rocks and crashing into the Fairy Lochs, scattering wreckage over a wide area. All 15 crew and passengers on board perished in the accident.

Today much of the wreckage remains where the plane crashed. Pieces of fuselage lie in the bogs and a propeller and an engine can be seen protruding from the lochan. The area is classed as a war grave and visitors are expected not to disturb the wreckage. A memorial plaque, listing those who died, was erected by the families and friends of those killed.

The loss of the USAAF 42-95095 was not unique in this region, as other accidents involving military aircraft have taken place nearby. In 1951, an Avro Lancaster crashed on Beinn Eighe, a mountain near Slioch on the opposite shore of Loch Maree.

References

External links

The B-24H Liberator 42-95095 on Air Crash Sites Scotland
The Fairy Lochs War Grave – Gairloch – video footage of the war grave

1945 in military history
1945 in Scotland
1945 in the United States
Aviation accidents and incidents in 1945
June 1945 events in the United Kingdom
Aviation accidents and incidents locations in Scotland
Lochs of Highland (council area)
World War II memorials in Scotland
Military monuments and memorials in the United States
Ross and Cromarty
20th-century history of the United States Air Force
Freshwater lochs of Scotland
Foreign relations of Scotland
United States Army Air Forces